"Everything but You" is the third and final single from singer Brian McFadden's second album Set in Stone. It was released in November 2008 via iTunes.

Music video
The video of the song was shot in Sydney, Australia, (like the previous video for "Twisted") by the same director used for the "Twisted" video. It shows Brian in the studio 'recording' the song. Brian also had broken fingers during the video which was well hidden in the final version.

Track listing
Australian digital single
 "Everything but You"
 "Like Only a Woman Can" (Irish version)

Charts

References

Irish Singles Chart number-one singles
2007 singles
2008 singles
Brian McFadden songs
Songs written by Brian McFadden
Pop ballads
Songs written by Jez Ashurst
2007 songs